The Altar is a flat-topped  rock summit in Antarctica at the head of Grautskala Cirque, immediately west of Altarduken Glacier, in the Humboldt Mountains of Queen Maud Land.  Discovered and given the descriptive name Altar by the German Antarctic Expedition under Ritscher, 1938–39.

Mountains of Queen Maud Land
Humboldt Mountains (Antarctica)